The John Player Trophy was a golf tournament on the European Tour that was played in England. It was played twice. The first event in 1970 at Notts Golf Club in Nottinghamshire was the 36-hole qualifying event for the John Player Classic. In 1972, at Bognor Regis Golf Club in West Sussex, it was run as a separate tournament.

Winners

References

External links
Coverage on the European Tour's official site

Former European Tour events
Golf tournaments in England